Ctenopseustis haplodryas is a species of moth of the family Tortricidae. It is found in Kenya, where it has been recorded from the west slope of Mount Kenya.

References

Archipini
Endemic moths of Kenya
Moths described in 1920
Taxa named by Edward Meyrick